Liga Deportiva Universitaria de Quito's 2006 season was the club's 76th year of existence, the 53rd year in professional football, and the 45th in the top level of professional football in Ecuador.

Kits
Supplier: Umbro
Sponsor(s): Movistar, Coca-Cola, Pilsener

Squad

Competitions

Serie A

First stage

Results

Second stage

Results

Liguilla Final

Results

Copa Libertadores

Copa Libertadores squad

Second stage

Round of 16

Quarter-finals

Copa Sudamericana

Copa Sudamericana squad

First stage

External links
2006 season on RSSSF

2006
Ldu